The 2022 Texas Bowl was a college football bowl game played on January 4, 2022, with kickoff at 9:00 p.m. EST (8:00 p.m. local CST) and televised on ESPN. It was the 15th edition of the Texas Bowl, and was one of the 2021–22 bowl games concluding the 2021 FBS football season. Sponsored by tax preparation software company TaxAct, the game was officially known as the TaxAct Texas Bowl. This was the first edition of the Texas Bowl to be played in the month of January.

Teams
Consistent with conference tie-ins, the game was played between teams from the Big 12 Conference and the Southeastern Conference (SEC).

This was the second meeting between Kansas State and LSU; the Tigers defeated the Wildcats, 21–0, on September 13, 1980, at Tiger Stadium in Baton Rouge, the teams' only prior meeting.

Kansas State Wildcats

Kansas State finished their regular season with an overall 7–5 record, 4–5 in Big 12 games. After starting their season with three wins, the Wildcats fell to 3–3, then won four games in a row before ending the season with back-to-back losses. Kansas State faced two ranked teams in FBS during the season, losing to Oklahoma and Baylor.

LSU Tigers

LSU finished their regular season with an overall 6–6 record, 3–5 in SEC play. After starting the season ranked No. 16 LSU lost their first game to unranked UCLA.  LSU won their next three games, lost five of their next six games, and finished their schedule with back-to-back wins to become bowl eligible. Four of the five losses LSU's suffered were to ranked FBS teams; they defeated two ranked teams, Florida and Texas A&M. Head coach Ed Orgeron left the program at the end of the regular season, and offensive line coach Brad Davis was named interim head coach for the Texas Bowl.

Due to one quarterback (Max Johnson) transferring, one quarterback (Myles Brennan) recovering from injury, and the decision to not start their last remaining eligible scholarship quarterback (Garrett Nussmeier) in order to preserve his redshirt status, LSU instead had wide receiver Jontre Kirklin start as their quarterback. Kirklin had not played as a quarterback since high school in 2016. With the loss to Kansas State in the bowl game, LSU suffered their first losing season since 1999.

Game summary

Statistics

When the game began, Kasnas State scored early and held the lead the entire game.  LSU was hampered, having lost its starting quarterback who transferred to Texas A&M and backup quarterback recovering from surgery.  LSU had senior receiver Jontre Kirklin move to quarterback instead of starting eligible quarterback Garrett Nussmeier.  Kirklin had not played as a quarterback since high school in 2016 but was still picked as the starter over Nussmeier in order to preserve his redshirt status.  LSU did not get a first down until late in the second quarter and by that time Kansas State already had a 21–0 lead.  The final score was Kansas State 42, LSU 20.

References

External links
 Game statistics at statbroadcast.com

Texas Bowl
Texas Bowl
Kansas State Wildcats football bowl games
LSU Tigers football bowl games
Texas Bowl
Texas Bowl